Simina is a village in Kamrup rural district, situated near south bank of river Brahmaputra.

Transport
The village is near National Highway 37 and connected to nearby towns and cities with regular buses and other modes of transportation.

Schools
Anchalik High School is a high school that serves the Simina village.

See also
 Tarani
 Srihati

References

Villages in Kamrup district